Trinity Lutheran Church or Trinity Evangelical Lutheran Church or variations thereof may refer to:

Canada 

 Trinity Evangelical Lutheran Church (Toronto), Ontario

United States 
 Trinity Lutheran Church (Burr Ridge, IL)
 Trinity Evangelical Lutheran Church (Abilene, Kansas), listed on the National Register of Historic Places (NRHP) in Kansas
 Historic Trinity Lutheran Church, Detroit, Michigan
 Trinity Lutheran Church (Henning, Minnesota), listed on the NRHP in Minnesota
 Trinity Lutheran Church (Altenburg, Missouri)
 Trinity Lutheran Church (Freistatt, Missouri)
 Trinity Lutheran Church (Friedheim, Missouri)
 Trinity Evangelical Lutheran Church of Manhattan, New York
 Trinity Lutheran Church (Queens, New York), listed on the NRHP in New York
 Trinity Lutheran Church and Cemetery (Stone Arabia, New York), listed on the NRHP in New York
 Trinity Lutheran Church (Rutherfordton, North Carolina), listed on the NRHP in North Carolina
 Trinity Lutheran Church (Canton, Ohio)
 Trinity Lutheran Church (Cleveland, Ohio)
 Trinity Lutheran Church (Reading, Pennsylvania), listed on the NRHP in Pennsylvania
 Trinity Lutheran Church (Elloree, South Carolina), listed on the NRHP in South Carolina
 Trinity Lutheran Church (Victoria, Texas), listed on the NRHP in Texas
 Trinity Evangelical Lutheran Church, Milwaukee, Wisconsin